How Much of These Hills Is Gold is a 2020 debut novel by author C Pam Zhang. It was longlisted for the Booker Prize and won the Asian/Pacific American Award for Literature for Adult Fiction. The book was published by Riverhead Books in North America and by Virago Press in the United Kingdom and Commonwealth.

Development and writing
Zhang began the novel after waking up with the opening sentence in her head. She did not originally intend to write a novel, and after completing the first chapter, Zhang stopped working on the project for a period of time. The novel takes place in the American West, a setting explored in novels Zhang read when young, including East of Eden, Lonesome Dove, and Little House on the Prairie. The first chapter was written without conducting research, as Zhang did not want research to "stifle" her writing.

Though this novel was the first published by Zhang, she says that she has another "drawer" novel "that will never see the light of day".

Reception

Reviews
How Much of These Hills is Gold received positive reviews from Kirkus, Library Journal, The New York Times Book Review, and many other publications.  

Critics highlighted the lyrical quality of Zhang's writing. In his review of the book for The Irish Times, Oliver Farry wrote that the book's prose was "reminiscent" of authors Cormac McCarthy and Toni Morrison. Alexis Burling, writing for the San Francisco Chronicle, called the author's prose "exquisitely crafted," saying that "Zhang captures not only the mesmeric beauty and storied history of America’s sacred landscape, but also the harsh sacrifices countless people were forced to make in hopes of laying claim to its bounty." Kirkus called the book "[a]esthetically arresting and a vital contribution to America’s conversation about itself." 

NPR's Annalisa Quinn provided a mixed review, stating, "Zhang's style can be densely, airlessly lovely. Self-conscious lyricism fills the page like all that California dust, sometimes making it hard to breathe." The Asian Review of Books also proffered a mixed review.

The audiobook, narrated by Catherine Ho and Joel de la Fuente, received a starred review from Booklist's Jane Philbrick, who stated, "The discrimination the family experiences brings an almost constant feeling of danger; Ho leans into its menace by emphasizing slurs, threats, or speeding through the adrenaline of violence. De la Fuente['s] ... tired drawl reflects that history’s toll. "

The New York Times listed Zhang's novel as one of "100 Notable Books of 2020." Barack Obama listed the novel as one of his favorite books of 2020.

Kirkus and NPR named How Much of These Hills is Gold one of the best books of 2020.

Awards

References

2020 debut novels
2020 American novels
Orphans in fiction
Western (genre) novels
American historical fiction
Novels set in the 1800s
2020s LGBT novels
Virago Press books
Riverhead Books books